Maianthemum macrophyllum is a perennial flowering plant. It is a rare epiphtic herb endemic to Veracruz and Oaxaca, Mexico and is known only from primary cloud forests, usually growing on limbs of oaks or sweetgum (Liquidambar styraciflua).

Description
Stems are slightly arching, hairless and leafy.

Leaves
Leaves have a 5–9 mm long petiole. Leaf blades are hairless, shiny, egg- to lance-shaped with pointed tips and rounded bases and with flat (not undulating) edges. The veins are evident.

Flowering clusters
60 to 120 flowers are set in a dense, complex raceme. It is composed of a main axis that arches upwards and is straight, stiff, 10–20 cm long, green, smooth and of uniform width. 25 to 50 nodes 5–10 mm apart are arraigned in a helix around the main axis. Each node has 2 to 4 flowers set on drooping pedicels that are usually 4–6 mm long.

Flowers and fruits  
The flowers are yellow-green to green-white and cup-shaped with tepals 4.5-5.5 mm long. Stamens are inserted at the base of the tepals. Blooming takes 3–4 weeks, with lower flowers opening first, and proceeding up the axis. Fruits are rounded, 8–9 mm across, green when immature, ripening to red. Flowering is from April to June, fruiting through to October.

Distribution
Maianthemum macrophyllum has only been documented in Veracruz and Oaxaca, Mexico.

Habitat and ecology
It is known only from primary cloud forests, usually growing on limbs of oaks or sweetgum (Liquidambar styraciflua) at 1300 to 2600 m.

References

macrophyllum
Flora of Veracruz
Flora of Oaxaca